The 1955–56 season was Aberdeen's 43rd season in the top flight of Scottish football and their 45th season overall. Aberdeen competed in the Scottish League Division One, Scottish League Cup, and the Scottish Cup

Results

Division 1

Final standings

Scottish League Cup

Group 3

Group 3 final table

Knockout stage

Scottish Cup

References

AFC Heritage Trust

Aberdeen F.C. seasons
Aber